Jai Bhagwan Goyal (born 6 October 1959) is an Indian politician affiliated with the Bharatiya Janata Party (BJP). He is also a National President of Rashtrawadi Shiv Sena.

Early life
Jai Bhagwan Goyal was born in Ludhiana, Punjab to Shri Hari Ram Goyal and Smt Pista Devi. He is a Hindu and belongs to the Bania community.

Political career
Jai Bhagwan Goyal is currently a member of the Bharatiya Janata Party. He was a member of Shiv Sena Punjab District in 1982 to 1987 Shiv Sena. Later he was appointed as Shivsena's North Delhi Head Shiv Sena. He became a Shiv Sena's Head Delhi Branch (1988 to 1990). To see the capability and ability of Jai Bhagwan Goyal later he is appointed as National Chief of North East and Delhi Shiv Sena in 1990 (1990 to 2008). During his lifetime he did work for people in any manner dedicated. Later in 2008 Jai Bhagwan Goyal quits Shiv Sena due to inhuman treatment meted out to North Indians in Maharashtra.
Later he creates his own party Rashtrawadi Shiv Sena in 2008 with all his supporter and he became National President of Rashtrawadi Shiv Sena.
In Feb 2014, Jai Bhagwan Goyal join BJP Bhartiya Janata Party with thousands of his supporters.

Personal life
Jai Bhagwan Goyal  is married to Usha Goyal, and together they have three sons and all are well settled business men in Delhi...

References

External links
 
 
 

1959 births
Living people
Bharatiya Janata Party politicians from Punjab
Politicians from Ludhiana
Shiv Sena politicians